Cryptocarya ferrarsii is a species of small forest tree in the family Lauraceae. It is endemic to the Middle Andaman Island of India.

References

ferrarsii
Flora of the Andaman Islands
Critically endangered plants